This is a list of the main career statistics of professional Belgian tennis player Justine Henin.

Performance timelines
Only main-draw results in WTA Tour, Grand Slam tournaments, Fed Cup and Olympic Games are included in win–loss records.

Singles

Doubles

Grand Slam tournament finals

Singles: 12 (7 titles, 5 runner-ups)

Other significant finals

Olympic finals

Singles: 1 (1 gold medal)

WTA Championships finals

Singles: 2 (2 titles)

WTA Premier Mandatory & 5 finals

Singles: 14 (10 titles, 4 runner-ups)

Doubles: 1 (1 title)

WTA career finals

Singles: 61 (43 titles, 18 runner-ups)

Doubles: 3 (2 titles, 1 runner–up)

Team competition finals: 3 finals (1 title, 2 runner-ups)

ITF Circuit finals

Singles: 7 (7 titles)

Doubles: 3 (2 titles, 1 runner–up)

WTA Tour career earnings
Henin earned more than 20 million dollars during her career.

Career Grand Slam statistics

Grand Slam tournament seedings
The tournaments won by Henin are in boldface, and advanced into finals by Henin are in italics.

Singles

Best Grand Slam results details 
Grand Slam winners are in boldface, and runner–ups are in italics.

Singles

Head-to-head record against other players
Henin's win–loss record against certain players who have been ranked World No. 10 or higher is as follows. Active players are in boldface:

Top 10 wins

Longest winning streaks

32-match win streak (2007–08)

Comparison of the 2003–present year-end number ones
Comparisons between the WTA singles year-end number one ranked players from 2003, the year Henin was first ranked year-end number one.

Ranking points
Adjusted to reflect the raising of the points scale (2007 and 2009), reduction of tournaments counted (2009) and removal of quality points (2006).
Not an exact figure but a good approximation of how they would have scored under the current system.
Original total in brackets.
 Serena Williams 2013 – 13,260
 Justine Henin 2007 – 12310 (6155)
 Justine Henin 2003 – 11514 (6628)
 Justine Henin 2006 – 11423 (3998)
 Victoria Azarenka 2012 10595
 Lindsay Davenport 2005 – 9334 (4910)
 Jelena Jankovic 2008 – 9120 (4710)
 Serena Williams 2009 – 9075
 Lindsay Davenport 2004 – 8317 (4760)
 Caroline Wozniacki 2010 – 8035
 Caroline Wozniacki 2011 – 7485

Tournaments won
1. Serena Williams 2013 – 11 (2 GS + YEC)
2. Justine Henin 2007 – 10 (2 GS + YEC)
3. Justine Henin 2003 – 8 (2 GS)
4. Lindsay Davenport 2004 – 7
5. Justine Henin 2006 – 6 (1 GS + YEC)    Victoria Azarenka 2012 – 6 (1 GS)  Lindsay Davenport 2005 – 6    Caroline Wozniacki 2010 – 6    Caroline Wozniacki 2011 – 6
10. Jelena Jankovic 2008 – 4
11. Serena Williams 2009 – 3 (2 GS + YEC)

Tournaments played
1. Jelena Jankovic 2008 – 22    Caroline Wozniacki 2010 – 22    Caroline Wozniacki 2011 – 22
4. Justine Henin 2003 – 18
5. Lindsay Davenport 2004 – 17
6. Lindsay Davenport 2005 – 16    Serena Williams 2009 – 16
8. Justine Henin 2007 – 15
9. Serena Williams 2013 – 14
10. Justine Henin 2006 – 13

Winning percentage
 Serena Williams 2013 – 95.12%
 Justine Henin 2007 – 94.0%
 Justine Henin 2006 – 88.2%
 Justine Henin 2003 – 87.4% Victoria Azarenka 2012 – 87.4%
 Lindsay Davenport 2004 – 86.3%
 Lindsay Davenport 2005 – 83.3%
 Serena Williams 2009 – 79.4%
 Caroline Wozniacki 2011 – 78.8% Caroline Wozniacki 2010 – 78.8%

Lead over #2 ranked player
Percentage of ranking points
 Justine Henin 2007 – 39.5% (Kuznetsova)
 Serena Williams 2013 – 39.3% (Azarenka)
 Jelena Jankovic 2008 – 18.0% (S Williams)
 Caroline Wozniacki 2010 – 15.0% (Zvonareva)
 Serena Williams 2009 – 14.0% (Safina)
 Justine Henin 2006 – 11.7% (Sharapova)
 Lindsay Davenport 2004 – 4.5% (Mauresmo)
 Lindsay Davenport 2005 – 1.7% (Clijsters)
 Caroline Wozniacki 2011 – 1.5% (Kvitova)
 Justine Henin 2003 – 1.1% (Clijsters)

Lead over #10 ranked player
Percentage of ranking points
 Serena Williams 2013 – 73.5% (Wozniacki)
 Justine Henin 2003 – 66.5% (Sugiyama)
 Justine Henin 2006 – 65.2% (Vaidisova)
 Justine Henin 2007 – 64.4% (Bartoli)
 Serena Williams 2009 – 62.0% (Radwanska)
 Jelena Jankovic 2008 – 61.5% (Radwanska)
 Lindsay Davenport 2004 – 50.4% (Capriati)
 Caroline Wozniacki 2010 – 47.0% (Azarenka)
 Lindsay Davenport 2005 – 46.5% (V Williams)
 Caroline Wozniacki 2011 – 38.8% (Petkovic)

Notes

References

External links

Tennis career statistics